Bacillus sonorensis is a species of bacteria with type strain L87-10T (= NRRL B-23154T). Its genome has been sequenced.

Characteristics of B. sonorensis 
S.I. Paul et al. (2021) isolated and identified Bacillus sonorensis (strains KSP163A, and OA122) from marine sponges (Haliclona oculata and Cliona carteri, respectively) of the Saint Martin's Island Area of the Bay of Bengal, Bangladesh. Colony, morphological, physiological, and biochemical characteristics of B. sonorensis are shown in the Table below.

Note: + = Positive, – =Negative, W= Weakly Positive, V= Variable (+/–)

References

Further reading

External links

LPSN
Type strain of Bacillus sonorensis at BacDive -  the Bacterial Diversity Metadatabase

sonorensis
Bacteria described in 2001